The 1965 Iraq Central FA Perseverance Cup was the 4th edition of the Iraq Central FA Perseverance Cup, and the first since the competition's name was changed from Altruism Cup to Perseverance Cup. The match was contested between the winners and runners-up of the 1964–65 edition of the Iraq Central FA League, Maslahat Naqil Al-Rukab and Aliyat Al-Shorta respectively. Maslahat Naqil Al-Rukab won the game 1–0 with an extra-time goal by Qais Hameed to win the cup for the first time in their history.

Match

Details

References

External links
 Iraqi Football Website

Football competitions in Iraq